The Caldwell Home Place (also known as the Myer General Store or The Home Place) is a historic house located at 160 Curry Street in LaBelle, Florida.

Description and history 
As originally constructed around 1896, the building stood on the banks of the Caloosahatchee River to serve as a store with a mail drop and supply station for the then sparsely populated community.

It was added to the National Register of Historic Places on February 13, 2003.

References

External links
 Hendry County listings at National Register of Historic Places

Houses in Hendry County, Florida
Houses on the National Register of Historic Places in Florida
National Register of Historic Places in Hendry County, Florida
Vernacular architecture in Florida